Charlie Davey (11 May 1908 – 14 August 1991) was an Australian rules footballer who played in the Victorian Football League (VFL).

Recruited from the Chelsea Football Club, Davey made his debut for the Carlton Football Club in Round 18 of the 1927 season.

In his first VFL match, against St Kilda, on 10 September 1927, playing at centre half-forward, he kicked six goals.

He had been a last minute inclusion in the senior team (due to injuries and suspensions to selected players), and he had not been in the selected team announced on the Saturday morning. According to The Argus,
"[The new man] Davey showed great promise. Davey is a tall young player, who marks splendidly, and should be a success on the forward line, his six goals being a fine performance. He is aged 19 years, and is 6ft. 3½in. [192cm.] in height".

The next match, the 1927 Semi-Final that Carlton lost to Richmond 12.10 (82) to 11.10 (76), he played at full-forward and kicked one goal.

He was soon moved into the ruck, and became one of the VFL's best ruckmen of his day.

He was strong and versatile in the ruck, a reliable kick, and an outstanding strong mark. He was renowned for his use of his body strength to create space for his smaller team-mates.

In 1933, he survived electrocution.

He was Carlton's captain in 1935.

He retired prematurely at the end of the 1937 season,  due to a chronic knee injury, having played 143 senior games for Carlton, and having kicked 121 goals.

He also played 17 games for Victoria.

He served on the Carlton Committee from 1938 until December 1964.

In 1994 he was posthumously inducted into the Carlton Hall of Fame.

References

External links
 
 
 Charlie Davey at Blueseum
 Carlton Hall of Fame

1908 births
1991 deaths
Australian rules footballers from Victoria (Australia)
Australian Rules footballers: place kick exponents
Carlton Football Club players